The 1952 Michigan State Spartans football team was an American football team that represented Michigan State College as an independent during the 1952 college football season. In their sixth year under head coach Clarence "Biggie" Munn, the Spartans recorded a perfect 9–0 record, outscored opponents by a total of 312 to 84, and was recognized as the 1952 national champion. The season was part of a 28-game winning streak that began in October 1950 and continued until October 1953.

In the final AP Poll released on December 1, 1952, Michigan State was ranked No. 1 with 2,683 points, more than 400 points ahead of No. 2 Georgia Tech. The Spartans also finished with the No. 1 ranking the in the final UPI coaches poll. The team was also recognized as the 1952 national champion in later analyses issued by the Boand System, DeVold System, Dunkel System, College Football Researchers Association, Helms Athletic Foundation, Litkenhous, National Championship Foundation, Sagarin Ratings, and Williamson System. It was Michigan State's first consensus national championship. Five other selectors chose Georgia Tech as national champion. It was also Michigan State's last year as a football independent, as the Spartans became a football member of the Big Ten Conference in 1953.

Four Michigan State players were recognized on the 1952 All-America college football team: back Don McAuliffe (first-team honors from the United Press, All-America Board, and Collier's); center Dick Tamburo (first-team honors from the Associated Press, Central Press Association, and International News Service); guard Frank Kush (first-team honors from the Associated Press); and end Ed Luke (second-team honors from the Associated Press).

The team's statistical leaders included quarterback Tom Yewcic with 941 passing yards, halfback Billy Wells with 585 rushing yards, end Ellis Duckett with 323 receiving yards, and halfbacks Don McAuliffe and Leroy Bolden with 54 points each.

Schedule

Personnel

Roster 

 Howard Adams, guard
 Wayne Benson, fullback
 Alex Bleahu, tackle
 Doug Bobo, end
 Leroy Bolden, halfback
 Leo Boyd, halfback
 Bob Breniff, guard
 Hank Bullough, guard
 Rex Corless, halfback
 Don Cutler, tackle
 Paul Dekker, end
 Don Dohoney, end
 Rollie Dotsch, guard/tackle
 Ellis Duckett, end
 Jim Ellis, safety
 Chuck Fairbanks
 Larry Fowler, tackle
 Al Fracassa, quarterback
 Chuck Frank, tackle
 Don Kauth, end
 Joe Klein, tackle
 Frank Kush, guard
 Gene Lekenta, fullback
 Ed Luke, end
 Don McAuliffe, halfback
 Jack Morgan, tackle
 Morley Murphy, tackle
 Jim Neal, center
 Dick Panin, fullback
 Vince Pisano, halfback
 Bill Quinlin, end
 Don Schiesswohl, guard
 Gordon Serr, guard
 Evan Slonac, fullback
 Dick Tamburo, center
 Willie Thrower, quarterback
 Ed Timmerman, fullback
 Ray Vogt, halfback
 Doug Weaver, center
 Billy Wells, halfback
 John Wilson, halfback
 Johnny Wilson, quarterback
 Tom Yewcic, quarterback
 Bert Zagers, halfback

Coaching staff
 Head coach - Clarence "Biggie" Munn
 Assistant coaches - Duffy Daugherty, Dan Devine, Earle Edwards, Dewey King, Steve Sebo

1953 NFL Draft

References

Michigan State
Michigan State Spartans football seasons
College football national champions
College football undefeated seasons
Michigan State Spartans football